Selwyn George "Bill" Lane E.D. R.L. (1922–2000) was an Australian amateur ornithologist who worked for the Sydney County Council for most of life until he retired in 1983.

Career

Bill Lane joined the Royal Australasian Ornithologists Union (RAOU) in 1947, was a State Representative for New South Wales on that body from 1964 until 1967, and a Vice-President from 1968 to 1969.  He was elected a Fellow of the RAOU in 1983.  He was a founding member and President of the Australian Bird Study Association.

Lane banded Australian birds for half a century (from the 1950s to the 1990s) throughout Australia, and was an early experimenter with cannon netting. He also helped in the training of many of Australia's bird-banders. Lane published numerous articles in the Australian Bird Bander, Corella and Emu.  He was instrumental in raising the awareness of the impact urban development has upon the habitat and distribution of Australia's native birds and other animals.  He was awarded the inaugural John Hobbs Medal of the RAOU in 1995 in recognition of his contributions to amateur ornithology.

S.G. 'Bill' Lane Award

The S.G. 'Bill' Lane Award is presented annually by the Australian Bird Study Association to the most outstanding student in ornithology at Charles Sturt University.  Recipients of the award are:
2001: Cheryl Gole
2002: Helen Stevens
2003: Maria Grazia Bellio
2004: Lara Juliusson, of Denver, Colorado, USA.
2005: Gavin Jackson
2006: Alison Bowling 
2007: Jennifer Nicholls, Leonie Daws and Philip Hughes
2008: Simon Robinson
2009: Dr Anne Lehnert
2010: Peter McGregor
2011: Bronwyn McCulloch
2012: Michelle Smart
2013: Mary Thompson
2014: Sara Judge
2015: Kirsty Wilhes
2016: David Smith
2017: Robert Faulconbridge
2018: Louise Williams
2019: Claire Williams

References
Morris, Alan. (2000). Obituary. Selwyn George (Bill) Lane. 1922-2000. Emu 100: 160.

External links
 Australian Bird Study Association Inc.
 Birdlife Australia
 Charles Sturt University

See also
Lorraine Island
List of ornithologists
 List of ornithology awards

Australian ornithologists
1922 births
2000 deaths
20th-century Australian zoologists